The 1986 Asia Cup (also known as the John Player Gold Leaf Trophy) was the second Asia Cup tournament, and was held in Sri Lanka between March 30 and April 6. Three teams took part in the tournament: Pakistan, Sri Lanka and Asian leading associate member Bangladesh. India pulled out of the tournament due to strained cricketing relations with Sri Lanka and was replaced by Asian leading associate nation Bangladesh, which had qualified by winning the 1984 South-East Asia Cup.

The 1986 Asia Cup was a round-robin tournament where each team played the other once, and the top two teams qualifying for a place in the final. Pakistan won both its matches and qualified for the final against Sri Lanka. Sri Lanka beat Pakistan to win their first Asia Cup.

Squads

Matches

Group stage

Final

Statistics

Most runs

Most wickets

See also
 Asia Cup

References

 Cricket Archive: John Player Gold Leaf Trophy (Asia Cup) 1985/86 http://www.cricketarchive.co.uk/Archive/Seasons/SL/1985-86_SL_John_Player_Gold_Leaf_Trophy_(Asia_Cup)_1985-86.html
 WisdenAlmanack: John Player Gold Leaf Trophy (Asia Cup) http://content-search.cricinfo.com/wisdenalmanack/content/story/150621.html

External links
 Cricket archive tournament page

1986
1986 in Sri Lankan cricket
International cricket competitions from 1985–86 to 1988
Cricket, Asia Cup, 1986
International cricket competitions in Sri Lanka
March 1986 sports events in Asia
April 1986 sports events in Asia